The Source Presents: Hip Hop Hits, Volume 7 is the seventh annual music compilation album to be contributed by The Source magazine.  Released December 9, 2003, and distributed by Def Jam Recordings, Hip Hop Hits Volume 7 features fifteen hip hop and rap hits (one of them being the bonus track).  It went to number 49 on the Top R&B/Hip Hop Albums chart and number 86 on the Billboard 200 album chart.

This is the fifth album in the series not to have a Hot 100 number one hit, but three songs, Air Force Ones, Jump Off and Work It hit number one on the Hot Rap Tracks chart, while Luv U Better and Work It hit number one on the R&B charts.

Track listing
Act a Fool - Ludacris
Beautiful - Snoop Dogg, Pharrell Williams and Charlie Wilson
Thugz Mansion - 2Pac and Anthony Hamilton
Air Force Ones - Kyjuan, Murphy Lee and Nelly
The Jump Off - Lil' Kim and Mr. Cheeks
Can't Let You Go - Fabolous, Lil' Mo and Mike Shorey
Rock the Party - Benzino and Mario Winans
Where the Hood At? - DMX
Never Scared - Bone Crusher, Busta Rhymes and Jadakiss
Like a Pimp - David Banner and Lil' Flip
Mesmerize - Ashanti and Ja Rule
Luv U Better - LL Cool J
Beware of the Boys [Jay-Z Remix] - Jay-Z and Panjabi MC
Work It - Missy Elliott
Untouchables - Benzino ft. The Untouchables

References

Hip hop compilation albums
2003 compilation albums
Def Jam Recordings compilation albums